Live at the Gods is a live album by Bob Catley. Recorded at The Gods 98, Wigan, UK, 15 November 1998, this disc was included on the Japanese release of Bob's first solo album The Tower. It was released by Now & Then Records in 1999.

Track listing 
All songs written by Gary Hughes except where noted.

 "Dreams" — 6:46
 "Scream" — 7:11
 "Far Away" — 7:15
 "Deep Winter" — 5:13
 "Lonely Night" (Tony Clarkin) — 3:58
 "Fire and Ice" — 4:55
 "On a Storyteller's Night" (Tony Clarkin) — 4:48
 "The Tower" — 6:26
 "Fear of the Dark" — 7:37
 "Just Like an Arrow" (Tony Clarkin) — 3:53

Personnel
Bob Catley — Vocals
Vinny Burns — Guitar
Paul Hodson — Keyboards
Murray Daigle — Vocals, Guitar
Mike Dmitrovic — Rhythm Guitar
Sean Gregory — Bass
Kyle Lazenka — Drums

Production
Engineered by Royston Hollyer
Mixing by Audu Obaje
Mastered by Jon Blamire

References

External links
 www.bobcatley.com — Official Bob Catley site

Live At The Gods
Albums produced by Gary Hughes
1999 live albums
Frontiers Records live albums